Anthony "Tony" Donatelli (born June 7, 1984 in Glenside, Pennsylvania) is an American soccer player who plays as a midfielder for the Baltimore Blast of the Major Arena Soccer League.

Career

Youth and College
Donatelli played for Hunter Soccer Club as a child before playing college soccer at Temple University from 2002 to 2005, and with the Ocean City Barons in the USL Premier Development League. In 2005, he was named to the PDL All-Eastern Conference Team after finishing second in Barons scoring with ten goals and six assists in sixteen games played. Tony played youth soccer for The Philadelphia soccer club, FC Coppa.

Professional
Donatelli was drafted in the third round of the 2006 MLS Supplemental Draft by Houston Dynamo, but was not offered a contract by the team. He signed instead with the Vancouver Whitecaps in the USL First Division, and scored two goals and two assists in twenty-four games played in his debut season. In the 2006 playoffs, Donatelli made a significant impact, scoring three times in four games including a goal in Vancouver's 3–0 win over the Rochester Rhinos in the USL Division One Championship game.

On June 10, 2008, Donatelli was traded to Montreal Impact for Charles Gbeke. On October 20, 2008 Donatelli accepted a two-year extension deal. During the 2008 season he was loaned for a match to the Impact's farm team Trois-Rivières Attak in the Canadian Soccer League. During the 2009 USL season Donatelli contributed by helping the Impact clinch a playoff spot under new head coach Marc Dos Santos. He recorded his first playoff goal in the quarterfinal match against Charleston Battery in the second match of the aggregate series. The match concluded in a 2–1 victory for the Impact, which resulted in 4–1 victory on aggregate allowing the Impact to advance to the semifinals. He scored his second playoff goal against the Puerto Rico Islanders where match resulted in 2–1 victory for the Impact, and allowing the Impact to advance to the finals by winning their second match on aggregate. Montreal would advance on to the finals where their opponents would end up being the Vancouver Whitecaps FC, thus marking the first time in USL history where the final match would consist of two Canadian clubs. On October 17, 2009 in the second game of finals Donatelli scored the opening goal on a penalty kick in a 3–1 victory, therefore winning the match and claiming Montreal's third USL Championship.

Donatelli signed with San Jose Earthquakes on January 28, 2011. He trained with the club for one month before being waived on March 1, 2011, prior to the start of the MLS season. He subsequently signed with USL Pro club Rochester Rhinos on March 18, 2011.

Donatelli moved to fellow USL Pro team Charleston Battery on March 27, 2012 and helped the club win the USL Pro League title.

After the 2012 outdoor season, Donatelli returned to the indoor game where he signed with the Baltimore Blast of the Major Indoor Soccer League. He would help them win the 2012/13 MISL title and over the next three years, Donatelli played both indoor and outdoor soccer, before focusing solely on the indoor game starting in the 2015/16 campaign. During his time with the Blast, he helped them win three straight Major Arena Soccer League championships from 2015 - 2018.

In 2016, Donatelli earned his first cap with the U.S. Futsal National Team in a 4-4 draw against Canada in the 2016 CONCACAF Futsal Championship.

Honors

Baltimore Blast
 Major Indoor Soccer League Championship: 2012/13
 Major Arena Soccer League Championship: 2015/16, 2016/17, 2017/18

Charleston Battery
 USL Pro League Championship: 2012

Montreal Impact
 USL First Division Championship: 2009

Philadelphia Kixx
 Major Indoor Soccer League Championship: 2007

Vancouver Whitecaps
 USL First Division Championship: 2006

Career stats

References

External links
 Montreal Impact bio

1984 births
Living people
American expatriate sportspeople in Canada
American expatriate soccer players
American soccer players
American people of Italian descent
Expatriate soccer players in Canada
Association football midfielders
Ocean City Nor'easters players
Sportspeople from Montgomery County, Pennsylvania
Philadelphia KiXX (2001–2008 MISL) players
Rochester New York FC players
Charleston Battery players
Soccer players from Pennsylvania
Temple Owls men's soccer players
USL League Two players
USL First Division players
USSF Division 2 Professional League players
USL Championship players
Canadian Soccer League (1998–present) players
Major Indoor Soccer League (2008–2014) players
Vancouver Whitecaps (1986–2010) players
Montreal Impact (1992–2011) players
Trois-Rivières Attak players
Baltimore Blast (2008–2014 MISL) players
VSI Tampa Bay FC players
Ottawa Fury FC players
Penn FC players
Houston Dynamo FC draft picks
People from Cheltenham, Pennsylvania
North American Soccer League players
Baltimore Blast players
Major Arena Soccer League players
American men's futsal players